This is a list of episodes of the Japanese animated TV series . The episodes are directed by Kenji Kamiyama and produced by Production I.G. The English adaptation of the series was originally licensed by Geneon Entertainment before it dissolved and the licensed was transferred to Sentai Filmworks. The episodes are based on the Moribito series of Japanese fantasy novels, written by Nahoko Uehashi, and adapt the first installment, Moribito: Guardian of the Spirit, over twenty-six episodes. They aired from April 7, 2007, to September 29, 2007, on NHK-BS2.

Two pieces of theme music are used for the episodes; one opening theme and one closing theme. The opening theme is "Shine" by Japanese rock band L'Arc-en-Ciel, and the closing theme is Sachi Tainaka's .

Six DVD compilations, each containing two episodes of the series, have been released in Japan by Geneon Entertainment, with the latest released on November 21, 2007. A seventh compilation was released on December 21, 2007.

Episodes

See also

Guardian series
Moribito: Guardian of the Spirit

References

External links
Official site 
Official NHK site for the anime 

Moribito: Guardian of the Spirit